Chalicopoma semicostulatum is a species of minute, salt marsh snail with an operculum, aquatic gastropod mollusks, or micromollusks, in the family Assimineidae. 

This species is endemic to Guam.

References

External links
 Quadras, J. F.; Möllendorf, O. F. von. (1894). Diagnoses specierum novarum a J. F. Quadras in insulis Mariannis collectarum. Nachrichtsblatt der Deutschen Malakozoologischen Gesellschaft. 26(1-2): 13-22, 33-42
 Fukuda H. & Ponder W.F. 2003. Australian freshwater assimineids, with a synopsis of the Recent genus-group taxa of the Assimineidae (Mollusca: Caenogastropoda: Rissooidea). Journal of Natural History, 37: 1977-2032

Fauna of Guam
Gastropods described in 1894
Assimineidae